NGC 3377 is an elliptical galaxy in the constellation Leo. It is a member of the M96 Group and is about 26 Mly away, with a diameter of approximately 40 000 ly. A very faint companion galaxy, NGC 3377A is 7.1' NW.

Gallery

References

External links
 
 

3377
5899
32249
M96 Group
Elliptical galaxies
Leo (constellation)
17840408